Waiblingen is an electoral constituency (German: Wahlkreis) represented in the Bundestag. It elects one member via first-past-the-post voting. Under the current constituency numbering system, it is designated as constituency 264. It is located in central Baden-Württemberg, comprising the southern part of the Rems-Murr-Kreis district.

Waiblingen was created for the inaugural 1949 federal election. Since 2021, it has been represented by Christina Stumpp of the Christian Democratic Union (CDU).

Geography
Waiblingen is located in central Baden-Württemberg. As of the 2021 federal election, it comprises the municipalities of Alfdorf, Berglen, Fellbach, Kaisersbach, Kernen im Remstal, Korb, Leutenbach, Plüderhausen, Remshalden, Rudersberg, Schorndorf, Schwaikheim, Urbach, Waiblingen, Weinstadt, Welzheim, Winnenden, and Winterbach from the Rems-Murr-Kreis district.

History
Waiblingen was created in 1949. In the 1949 election, it was Württemberg-Baden Landesbezirk Württemberg constituency 12 in the numbering system. In the 1953 through 1961 elections, it was number 174. In the 1965 through 1976 elections, it was number 177. In the 1980 through 1998 elections, it was number 168. In the 2002 and 2005 elections, it was number 265. Since the 2009 election, it has been number 264.

Originally, the constituency was coterminous with the Waiblingen district. In the 1976 election, it acquired a configuration very similar to its current borders, but excluding the municipality of Alfdorf. It acquired its current borders in the 1980 election.

Members
The constituency was first represented by Karl Georg Pfleiderer of the Free Democratic Party (FDP) from 1949 to 1957, followed by Friedrich Fritz of the Christian Democratic Union (CDU) from 1957 to 1961. Carl Roesch of the Social Democratic Party (SPD) was elected in 1961 and served one term. Former member Fritz regained it in 1965, but Manfred Wende of the SPD won it in 1969. He served two terms. Paul Laufs of the CDU then served from 1976 to 2002, a total of seven consecutive terms. Joachim Pfeiffer was representative from 2002 to 2021. He was succeeded by Christina Stumpp in 2021.

Election results

2021 election

2017 election

2013 election

2009 election

References

Federal electoral districts in Baden-Württemberg
1949 establishments in West Germany
Constituencies established in 1949
Rems-Murr-Kreis